The 1965 NCAA College Division Swimming and Diving Championships were contested in March 1965 at Grove City College in Grove City, Pennsylvania at the first annual NCAA-sanctioned swim meet to determine the team and individual national champions of College Division men's collegiate swimming and diving in the United States.

This was the first championship hosted only for swimming programs in the College Division (future Divisions II and III). 

Bucknell topped the team standings, grabbing the inaugural national title for the Bison.

Team standings
Note: Top 10 only
(H) = Hosts
Full results

See also
List of college swimming and diving teams

References

NCAA College Division Swimming And Diving Championships
NCAA College Division Swimming And Diving Championships
NCAA College Division Swimming And Diving Championships